"Ninety Miles an Hour (Down a Dead End Street)" is a country music song written by Don Robertson and Hal Blair, recorded by Hank Snow, and released on the RCA Victor label. In October 1963, it reached No. 2 on the country charts, and spent 22 weeks on the charts.

References

Hank Snow songs
1963 songs
Songs written by Don Robertson (songwriter)
Songs written by Hal Blair